Mikhail Yordanov Bachvarov (29 December 1935 – 7 July 2009) was a Bulgarian sprinter. He competed in the men's 100 metres at the 1960 Summer Olympics. He participated twice in the European Championships – in 1958 and 1962.

He died on 7 July 2009 in Sofia.

References

External links
 

1935 births
2009 deaths
Athletes (track and field) at the 1960 Summer Olympics
Bulgarian male sprinters
Olympic athletes of Bulgaria